Ap Chau Mei Pak Tun Pai is a small island in the New Territories of Hong Kong. It is located in Ap Chau Bay just off the southern tip of Ap Chau and is not to be confused with Ap Chau Pak Tun Pai which is located further west. It is under the administration of North District.

References

Uninhabited islands of Hong Kong
North District, Hong Kong
Islands of Hong Kong